Group C of the 2014 FIBA Basketball World Cup was the group stage of the 2014 FIBA Basketball World Cup for the , , the United States,  and . Each team played each other once, for a total of five games per team, with all of the games played at Bizkaia Arena, Barakaldo (at Greater Bilbao). After all of the games were played, the four teams with the best records qualified for the final round.

Teams

Standings

All times are local UTC+2.

30 August

Ukraine vs. Dominican Republic
This was the first competitive game between Ukraine and the Dominican Republic.

New Zealand vs. Turkey
This was the first competitive game between New Zealand and Turkey.

United States vs. Finland
This was the first competitive game between the USA and Finland in the World Cup. The Americans defeated the Finns in their only other match-up at the 1964 Olympics.

31 August

Dominican Republic vs. New Zealand
This was the first competitive game between the Dominican Republic and the New Zealand.

Finland vs. Ukraine
This was the first competitive game between Finland and Ukraine in the World Cup. The two teams previously met twice in qualifying for the 1995 EuroBasket, with Finland winning both match-ups.

Turkey vs. United States
This was the second meeting between Turkey and the United States. The Americans won the last match-up at the 2010 FIBA World Championship Final.

2 September

Ukraine vs. Turkey
This was the first competitive game between Ukraine and Turkey in the World Cup. The two teams have previously met seven times in the EuroBasket, with Turkey winning five games, including the last match-up at EuroBasket Division A 2009.

United States vs. New Zealand
This was the second meeting between the USA and the New Zealand in the World Cup. The Americans won the first match-up, at the 2002 FIBA World Championship.

Finland vs. Dominican Republic
This was the first competitive game between Finland and the Dominican Republic.

3 September

New Zealand vs. Ukraine
This was the first competitive game between New Zealand and Ukraine.

Turkey vs. Finland
This was the first competitive game between Turkey and Finland in the World Cup. The two teams have previously met six times in EuroBasket with Turkey winning four of them. Last meeting in EuroBasket 2013 went to Finland.

Dominican Republic vs. United States
This was the second meeting between the Dominican Republic and the USA in the World Cup. The Americans won the first match-up at the 1978 FIBA World Championship. The Americans won in their last competitive game against the Dominicans at the 2005 FIBA Americas Championship.

4 September

Finland vs. New Zealand
This was the first competitive game between Finland and New Zealand.

Ukraine vs. United States
This was the first competitive game between Ukraine and the USA.

Turkey vs. Dominican Republic
This was the first competitive game between Turkey and the Dominican Republic.

External links
 
 

Group C
Group
2014–15 in Turkish basketball
2014–15 in Ukrainian basketball
2014–15 in Finnish basketball
2014 in New Zealand basketball
2014 in Dominican Republic sport